

History of the temple

Shri Mariamman Temple is situated in Periyakulam  Village on the way to Dindigul-Theni road which is 16 km away from Theni, Theni District, Tamil Nadu, India. 
Further, this temple is located in the centre of No-246 Pandiya Vellalar Thottam, Muthanamptti Pudur - East, Near Surabi college. Earlier, Shri Bhaktha Anjaneyar Temple was called as a Tulasi Garden. 
Inside the shrine of this temple, Shri Bhaktha Anjaneyar is installed with a big Gada on his left hand with a graceful look. This Gada is Shri Bhaktha Anjaneyar’s weapon to destroy the sins and calamities from the world. This whole appearance of Lord Shri Anjeeneyar in the shrine gives an unknown strength and faith to the devotees.
Moreover, a tall sculpture of Shri Bhaktha Anjaneyar with a height of about 51 feet has been installed above the shrine which resembles like a Tomb on the temple. This peculiar attraction remains unique in the whole south of Tamil Nadu.
Another temple made of crystal stone is constructed inside the campus of sacred corner (Kanni Moolai) where Lord Shri Jeya Vera Anjaneyar is installed. It is said that god stays in the sacred Corner.
Every month on special days like full-moon day, Amavasya, Ekadashi, Jenma Nakshatra etc. special Puja’s will be conducted without any interruption and on every Saturday after Puja Prasadam (Sacred food) is distributed inside the temple premises to about 100 devotees.
In the month of January (In Tamil-Marzhli) on the sacred day of Shri Anjaneyar Jayanthi (Birthday) special puja’s are conducted in a grand way and Annadhanam is done to the devotees.
People from various places, with lot of faith in their heart, visit this temple to have a glimpse of Shri Bhaktha Anjaneyar. They worship him with utmost devotion in their mind, heart and soul to get the blessings with a belief that their wishes shall be fulfilled after getting the darshan of  Shri Bhaktha Anjaneyar.

See also
 List of tallest statues
 Hanuman
 Dindigul
 Dindigul district
 Dindigul
 List of temples in Tamil Nadu
 List of Hindu temples in India
 List of statues

References
 www.anjaneyar.in
 https://www.flickr.com/photos/saranr/sets/72157635412093599/

Hanuman temples